Soapstone Ridge is a mafic-ultramafic geological complex located in the Piedmont region, south-east of Atlanta, Georgia on a  area in DeKalb County and neighboring Fulton and Clayton Counties.

The ridge was named from its deposits of metapyroxenite, which early settlers wrongly believed was soapstone. Many archaeological sites, including Late Archaic quarry sites dated between 600 BCE and 1500 BCE, occur on Soapstone Ridge. At least 17 quarry sites and 23 workshops sites have been located on Soapstone Ridge.

References

Archaeological sites in Georgia (U.S. state)
Geology of Georgia (U.S. state)
Geography of DeKalb County, Georgia
Geography of Fulton County, Georgia
Geography of Clayton County, Georgia
Archaeological sites on the National Register of Historic Places in Georgia (U.S. state)
National Register of Historic Places in DeKalb County, Georgia
National Register of Historic Places in Fulton County, Georgia
National Register of Historic Places in Clayton County, Georgia